The Jewish National Party was an Austrian political party of the Jewish minority.

History
A Jewish National Party was already founded in 1892 at Lemberg (Lviv), then the capital of the Austrian Kingdom of Galicia, as part of the Zionist movement in Austria-Hungary. It took part in the regional Sejm elections as well as in the 1907 Cisleithanian legislative election, gaining four parliamentary seats at the Austrian Imperial Council: 
Benno Straucher from Czernowitz, founder of the regional Jewish National People's Party in 1906 
Adolf Stand, Brody
Arthur Mahler
Heinrich Gabel, East Galicia. 
Only Straucher was re-elected at the 1911 election.

The Jewish National Party took part in the 16 February 1919 election to the 1919 Constituent Assembly and got 7,760 votes (0.26%). Its only elected MP was Robert Stricker, a board member of the Vienna Israelite Community.

At the next elections on 17 October 1920 a change in the electoral law eliminated all the minor parties from the Parliament. At the 21 October 1923 elections, a new party, the Jewish Electoral Community failed again to elect a representative, with 24,970 votes (0.8%), as the Jewish Party on the 24 April 1927 elections, with 10,845 votes (0.3%), the Jewish List on the 9 November 1930 elections, with 2,133 votes (0.1%).

References

Defunct political parties in Austria
Jewish political parties
Jewish Austrian history
Political parties of minorities
Zionism in Austria
Zionist political parties in Europe
Jewish Austro-Hungarian history
Political parties established in 1892